Yakhni, yahni (Turkish), or yahniya (Serbian) is a class of dishes prepared in a vast area from South Asia to the Balkans.

History 
A meat stew named yakhni originated in Medieval Persia. The name derives from the covered clay pot in which it was originally cooked. The meaning of the Persian word is "store of food". Different varieties of this dish later spread eastwards to Afghanistan, Uzbekistan and South Asia and westwards to the Ottoman Empire reaching the Levant and the Balkans.

Varieties 

In Iranian cuisine, yakhni is a meat stew akin to khoresh, while yakhni-polow is a pilaf cooked in a stew.

In Arab (especially Palestinian), Greek, and Turkish cuisines, it is a stew of meat, fish, or vegetables in a browned-onion base with tomatoes and olive oil. In Bulgarian cuisine, sunflower oil is used instead of olive oil.

In Romanian cuisine, the term iahnie de fasole refers to a style of baked beans, often cooked or served with smoked meat and sausages (fasole cu cârnați).

In  Pakistan and India, yakhni refers to stock or broth of beef, chicken, lamb or mutton. It is touted for its health benefits and is often the base for many foods including pulao (a pilaf) and other shorbas (soups).

In Bangladesh, akhni is a mixed rice dish and variant of the biryani and polao dishes.

A version of the dish is served at a Romani restaurant in Slovenia.

References

Central Asian cuisine
Afghan cuisine
Azerbaijani cuisine
Bulgarian cuisine
Greek cuisine
Indian cuisine
Iranian stews
Kashmiri cuisine
Mizrahi Jewish cuisine
Macedonian cuisine
Ottoman cuisine
Romanian cuisine